Anders Hartington Andersen (1 February 1907 – 10 January 1996) was a Danish long-distance runner. He competed in the marathon at the 1932 Summer Olympics and the 1936 Summer Olympics.

References

External links
 

1907 births
1996 deaths
Athletes (track and field) at the 1932 Summer Olympics
Athletes (track and field) at the 1936 Summer Olympics
Danish male long-distance runners
Danish male marathon runners
Olympic athletes of Denmark
People from Ringsted
Sportspeople from Region Zealand